Events in the year 2019 in Brazil.

Incumbents

Federal government 
 President: Jair Bolsonaro
 Vice President: Hamilton Mourão

Governors
 Acre: Gladson Cameli
 : Renan Filho
 Amapa: Waldez Góes
 Amazonas: Wilson Lima 
 Bahia: Rui Costa
 Ceará: Camilo Santana
 Espírito Santo: Renato Casagrande
 : Ronaldo Caiado
 Maranhão: Flávio Dino
 Mato Grosso: Mauro Mendes
 Mato Grosso do Sul: Reinaldo Azambuja
 Minas Gerais: Romeu Zema
 : Helder Barbalho
 Paraíba: João Azevêdo
 Paraná: Ratinho Júnior
 : Paulo Câmara
 Piauí: Wellington Dias
 Rio de Janeiro: 
 Rio Grande do Norte: Fátima Bezerra
 Rio Grande do Sul: Eduardo Leite
 Rondônia: Marcos Rocha
 Roraima: Antonio Denarium
 : Carlos Moisés
 São Paulo: João Doria
 : Belivaldo Chagas
 Tocantins: Mauro Carlesse

Vice governors
 Acre: Wherles Fernandes da Rocha
 Alagoas: José Luciano Barbosa da Silva
 Amapá: Jaime Domingues Nunes
 Amazonas: Carlos Alberto Souza de Almeida Filho
 Bahia: João Leão
 Ceará: Maria Izolda Cela de Arruda Coelho
 Espírito Santo: Jacqueline Moraes da Silva
 Goiás: Lincoln Graziane Pereira da Rocha
 Maranhão: Carlos Orleans Brandão Júnior
 Mato Grosso: Otaviano Olavo Pivetta
 Mato Grosso do Sul: Murilo Zauith
 Minas Gerais: Paulo Brant
 Pará: Lúcio Dutra Vale 
 Paraíba: Lígia Feliciano
 Paraná: Darci Piana
 Pernambuco: Luciana Barbosa de Oliveira Santos
 Piaui: Regina Sousa
 Rio de Janeiro: Francisco Dornelles (until 1 January); Cláudio Castro (starting 1 January)
 Rio Grande do Norte: Antenor Roberto
 Rio Grande do Sul: Ranolfo Vieira Júnior
 Rondônia: José Atílio Salazar Martins
 Roraima: Frutuoso Lins Cavalcante Neto
 Santa Catarina: Daniela Cristina Reinehr
 São Paulo: Rodrigo Garcia
 Sergipe: Eliane Aquino Custódio
 Tocantins: Wanderlei Barbosa Castro

Events

January 
 January 1: Inauguration of Jair Bolsonaro as the 38th President of Brazil.
 January 8: Brazil formally withdraws from the UN's Global Compact for Migration pact, however, Brazil's Foreign Minister Ernesto Araújo says that the country will continue to accept Venezuelan refugees.
 January 25: The Brumadinho dam disaster, when a mining dam owned by Vale, collapses in Minas Gerais, leaving 203 dead and one hundred and five individuals missing.

February 
 February 1: Rodrigo Maia is reelected President of Chamber of Deputies.
 February 2: Davi Alcolumbre is elected President of Senate.
 February 6: Heavy rain hits Rio de Janeiro, leaving six people dead and two missing.
 February 8: A fire on Flamengo youth academy training camp leaves ten people dead and three injured in Rio de Janeiro
 February 11: A helicopter carrying journalist and news anchor Ricardo Boechat crashes in São Paulo, killing both Boechat and the pilot.
 February 17: Four children die after a landslide in Mauá, São Paulo.

March 
 March 13: 
 Two former military police officers are arrested in Brazil for the murders of Marielle Franco and her driver Anderson Gomes. One of the suspects was arrested at home, in a Rio de Janeiro gated community where President Jair Bolsonaro also resides. Franco was born in a Rio favela and became a politician and activist against violence in the slums, which are often controlled by paramilitary groups. Her assassination prompted widespread protests.
 Two men, of 17 and 25 years old, attack a school in the Brazilian city of Suzano, São Paulo, with a revolver and a knife, killing eight and wounding 23 people, among students and staff. The two shooters commit suicide afterwards. Police find a crossbow, Molotov cocktails, and a "suitcase with wires" at the scene.
 March 21: Former President Michel Temer is arrested as part of an investigation into corruption. Former Governor of Rio de Janeiro Moreira Franco is also arrested.

April 
 April 7: Case Evaldo Rosa

May

June 
 June 20: 3 million evangelicals march in São Paulo For the "March For Jesus".

July 
 July 29: At least 52 people are killed, including sixteen who were beheaded, during a prison riot in Pará, which saw rival gangs battle for five hours.

August

September 
 The Northeast Brazil oil spill, which worsens in October, begins.

October

November 
 November 9: Former Brazilian President Luiz Inacio Lula da Silva walks out of prison on Friday after his release was ordered by a judge.
 November 12: Brazilian President Jair Bolsonaro forms his new party Alliance for Brazil.

December 
 December 26: a group called the "Popular Nationalist Insurgency Command of the Large Brazilian Integralist Family" claimed responsibility for a firebombing of the headquarters of comedy group Porta dos Fundos in Rio de Janeiro.

Arts and culture 
2018–19 Brazil network television schedule
List of Brazilian films of 2019

Sports 
2019 in Brazilian football

Deaths

January
January 8 – José Belvino do Nascimento, 86, Brazilian Roman Catholic prelate, Bishop of Itumbiara (1981–1987) and Divinópolis (1989–2009).
January 9 – Óscar González-Quevedo, 88, Spanish-born Brazilian Jesuit priest and parapsychologist, heart disease.
January 15 – Edyr de Castro, 72, Brazilian actress (Roque Santeiro, Por Amor, Cabocla), and singer, multiple organ failure.
January 28 – Antônio Petrus Kalil, 93, Brazilian criminal, pneumonia.

February
February 6 – Jairo do Nascimento, 72, Brazilian footballer (Corinthians, Coritiba), kidney cancer.
February 10 – Daniel Silva dos Santos, 36, Brazilian footballer, cancer.
February 11 – Ricardo Boechat, 66, Argentine-born Brazilian journalist (O Globo, O Dia, Jornal do Brasil), helicopter crash.
February 13 – Bibi Ferreira, 96, Brazilian actress (Leonora of the Seven Seas, The End of the River) and singer.
February 16 – Silvestre Luís Scandián, 87, Brazilian Roman Catholic prelate, Bishop of Araçuaí (1975–1981) and Archbishop of Vitória (1984–2004).
February 19 – João Paulo dos Reis Veloso, 87, Brazilian economist, Minister of Planning (1969–1979), president of the Institute of Applied Economic Research (1969).
February 23 – Douglas, 51, Brazilian-born Swedish scarlet macaw actor (Pippi in the South Seas).
 February 25
 Waldo Machado, 84, Brazilian footballer (Fluminense, Valencia, national team).
 Paulo Nogueira Neto, 96, Brazilian environmentalist, Secretary of the Environment (1974–1986).
 Nelson Zeglio, 92, Brazilian footballer (Sochaux, CA Paris, Roubaix-Tourcoing).

March
March 11 – Antônio Wilson Vieira Honório, 75, Brazilian football player (Santos, national team) and manager (Valeriodoce), world champion (1962), heart attack.
March 12 – Eurico Miranda, 74, Brazilian football chairman (Vasco da Gama) and politician, Deputy (1995–2002).
March 17 – João Carlos Marinho, 83, writer (O Gênio do Crime).
March 26 – Rafael Henzel, 45, Brazilian sports broadcaster, survivor of LaMia Flight 2933crash, heart attack.

April
April 7 – Jean Paul Jacob, 81–82, Brazilian-American computer scientist.
April 15 – Marcelo Dascal, 78, Brazilian-born Israeli philosopher and linguist.
April 19 – MC Sapão, 40, singer, pneumonia.
April 20 – Valdiram, 36, Brazilian footballer (CR Vasco da Gama), beaten.
April 21 – , 81, professor, translator (Paul Zumthor) and essayist, Prêmio Jabuti laureate (1993), cancer.
April 25 – Dirceu Krüger, 74, Brazilian footballer (Coritiba), heart attack.
April 26 – Zé do Carmo, 85, Brazilian ceramist, heart attack.
April 28
 Caroline Bittencourt, 37, Brazilian model, drowned.
 Maurício Peixoto, 98, Brazilian engineer and mathematician.
April 29 – José Rodrigues Neto, 69, Brazilian footballer (Flamengo, Ferro Carril Oeste, national team), thrombosis.
April 30 – Beth Carvalho, 72, Brazilian samba singer (Estação Primeira de Mangueira).

May
May 11 – , 92, Brazilian actor and comedian, respiratory failure.
May 14 – Urbano José Allgayer, 95, Brazilian Roman Catholic prelate, Bishop of Passo Fundo (1982–1999).
May 18 – Ney da Matta, 52, Brazilian football manager (Ipatinga, Brasiliense, CRAC), pancreatitis.
May 25 – Lady Francisco, 84, Brazilian actress.
May 27 – Gabriel Diniz, 28, Brazilian singer and composer, plane crash.

June
 June 2 – Gabi Costa, 33, Brazilian actress (Nada Será Como Antes), cardiorespiratory arrest.
 , 34, Brazilian film director and actress, brain tumor.
 Luisinho Lemos, 67, Brazilian footballer, heart attack.
 June 3
 , 86, Brazilian actress.
 , 86, Brazilian architect.
 June 7
 , 85, Brazilian rock singer-songwriter, multiple organ failure.
 , 87, Brazilian film director, actor and screenwriter.
 June 8 – Andre Matos, 47, Brazilian singer (Viper, Angra, Shaman), heart attack.
 June 9 – Rafael Miguel, 22, Brazilian actor (Chiquititas), shot.
 June 14 –  76, Brazilian journalist (Folha de S. Paulo), heart attack.
 June 17 – Moacyr Grechi, 83, Brazilian Roman Catholic prelate, Archbishop of Porto Velho (1998–2011).
 June 19 – , 74, Brazilian film critic.
 June 22
 Thalles, 24, Brazilian football player (Vasco da Gama, Ponte Preta, U20 national team), traffic collision.
 , 61, Brazilian drummer (RPM), pulmonary fibrosis.
 June 28 – Mário Jorge da Fonseca Hermes, 92, Brazilian basketball player.
 June 29 – Michael Uchendu, 21, Brazilian basketball player (Bauru), jet ski accident

July
 July 6
 João Gilberto, 88, Brazilian singer-songwriter.
 , 83, Brazilian journalist (O Globo), lawyer and sociologist.
 July 7 – , 93, Brazilian poet, complications from a fall.
 July 8 – Tunica Teixeira, 69, Brazilian sound designer and musical producer, cancer.
 July 10 – Paulo Henrique Amorim, 77, Brazilian journalist.
 July 28 – Ruth de Souza, 98, Brazilian actress.

August
August 2 – Gildo Cunha do Nascimento, 79, Brazilian footballer (Palmeiras, Flamengo, Paranaense).
August 9 – Altair Gomes de Figueiredo, 81, Brazilian footballer (Fluminense, national team).
August 12 – João Carlos Barroso, 69, Brazilian actor, pancreatic cancer.
August 23 – Kito Junqueira, 71, Brazilian actor (Eternamente Pagú) and politician.
August 25 – Fernanda Young, 49, Brazilian novelist, screenwriter and actress (Os Normais), cardiac arrest.
August 26 – Walmir Alberto Valle, 81, Brazilian Roman Catholic prelate, Bishop of Zé Doca (1991–2002) and Joaçaba (2003–2010), cancer.

September
September 1 – Alberto Goldman, 81, Brazilian politician, MP (1979–2006), Minister of Transport (1992–1993) and Governor of São Paulo (2010–2011), cancer.
September 4 – , 89, Brazilian MPB and samba singer, pneumonia.
September 7 – , 88, Brazilian actor.
September 15 – Roberto Leal, 67, Portuguese-Brazilian singer, skin cancer.
September 28 – Franco Cuter, 79, Italian-born Brazilian Roman Catholic prelate, Bishop of Grajaú (1998–2016).

October
October 8 – Serafim Fernandes de Araújo, 95, Brazilian Roman Catholic cardinal, Archbishop of Belo Horizonte (1986–2004), complications from pneumonia.
October 13 – Elias James Manning, 81, American-born Brazilian Roman Catholic prelate, Bishop of Valença (1990–2014).
October 16 – , 93, banker and businessman, President of Banco Bradesco (1981–2017).
October 24 – Walter Franco, 74, Brazilian singer and composer, stroke.
October 25 – Mário Sabino, 47, Brazilian Olympic judoka (2000, 2004), shot.
October 30 – Ercílio Turco, 81, Brazilian Roman Catholic prelate, Bishop of Limeira (1989–2002) and Osasco (2002–2014), cancer.

November
November 1 – Ary Kara, 77, Brazilian politician, Deputy (1983–2007), cancer.
November 3 – Girônimo Zanandréa, 83, Brazilian Roman Catholic prelate, Coadjutor Bishop (1987–1994) and Bishop of Erexim (1994–2012).
November 17 – Tuka Rocha, 36, Brazilian race car driver, plane crash.
November 18 – , 65, Brazilian singer, lung cancer.
November 20 – Fábio Barreto, 62, Brazilian film director (Lula, Son of Brazil, O Quatrilho), complications from a traffic collision.
November 22 – Gugu Liberato, 60, Brazilian television presenter, fall.
  November 22   – Henry Sobel, 75, Portuguese-born Brazilian-American reform rabbi, cancer.

See also

 2019 Pan American Games

References

 
2010s in Brazil
Brazil
Brazil
Years of the 21st century in Brazil